Eric Thompson (born August 4, 1993) is an American professional basketball player for CSO Voluntari of the Liga Națională. He played college basketball for Lake Michigan, Saddleback and the University of the Pacific before playing professionally in Germany, Switzerland, China, Japan and Israel.

Early life and college career
Thompson attended Pontiac High School in Pontiac, Michigan. He started his college basketball career at Lake Michigan College, where he averaged 9.7 points, 9.6 rebounds, 1.9 blocks and 1.2 steals per game, while shooting 55 percent from the field for the Red Hawks.

Thompson transferred to Saddleback College in Mission Viejo, California after redshirting in the 2012–13 season. Thompson led Saddleback to 24 wins, leading the team with 12.7 points and 8.6 rebounds (15th in state) per game. Thompson went on to play his final two years of college at the University of the Pacific, where he averaged 9.9 points, 7.5 rebounds and 1 block per game in his senior year.

Professional career

2016–17 season
On July 4, 2016, Thompson started his professional career with ETB Schwarz-Weiß of the German ProA. In 30 games played during the 2016–17 season, he averaged 10 points and 8 rebounds per game.

2017–18 season
On September 5, 2017, Thompson signed a one-year deal with Swiss Central Basket Luzern of the Swiss Basketball League. On March 4, 2018, Thompson recorded a double-double with a season-high 27 points and 15 rebounds, shooting 10-of-13 from the field, in a 75–83 loss to SAM Basket Massagno. In 25 games played for Luzern, he averaged a double-double of 16.2 points and 11.2 rebounds, while shooting 63.3 percent from the field.

On June 13, 2018, Thompson signed with Hefei Yuanchuang of the Chinese NBL for the 2018 season. On July 11, 2018, Thompson recorded a career-high 42 points, shooting 16-of-24 from the field, along with 23 rebounds and three blocks in a 119–150 loss to Hebei Xianglan. In 25 games played for Hefei, he averaged an impressive 23 points and 20 rebounds per game, while shooting 69.6 percent from the field.

2018–19 season
On September 18, 2019, Thompson signed with the Hiroshima Dragonflies of the Japanese B.League.  On February 10, 2019, Thompson parted ways with the Dragonflies to join the Kagawa Five Arrows for the rest of the season. On March 2, 2019, Thompson recorded a double-double of 24 points and 21 rebounds for 45 PIR, leading the Arrows to an 82–65 win over the Shinshu Brave Warriors. He was subsequently named the B.League Round 44 Best Performer. In 17 games played for the Arrows, he averaged 16.1 points and 14.4 rebounds and 2.6 assists per game.

2019–20 season
On August 28, 2019, Thompson signed a one-year deal with Hapoel Eilat of the Israeli Premier League. Thompson averaged 11.6 points and 9.3 rebounds per game.

2020–21 season
On July 8, Thompson signed with Incheon Electroland Elephants of the Korean Basketball League.

2021–22 season
On August 4, 2021, he has signed with CSO Voluntari of the Liga Națională. On February 17, 2022, Voluntari won the Romanian Cup after a final in which Thompson scored 13 points and grabbed 8 rebounds.

Career Statistics

|-
| align=center | 2016-17
| align=left | ETB Wohnbau Baskets 
| ProA
| 30 || 23.8 || .529 || .000 || .626 || 8.0 || .8 || .8 || .9 || 10.0
|-
| align=center | 2017-18
| align=left | Swiss Central Basket 
| Swiss League
| 23 || 29.4 || .649 || .000 || .605 || 11.0 || .9 || .8 || 1.0 || 15.9
|-
| align=center | 2017-18
| align=left | Hefei Yuanchuang 
| NBL-China
| 25 || 42.2 || .685 || .000 || .653 || 20.0 || 1.6 || .8 || 1.2 || 23.0
|-
| align=center | 2018-19
| align=left | Hiroshima / Kagawa
| B.League
| 47 || 31.8 || .603 || .000 || .568 || 11.8 || 2.0 || .8 || .5 || 13.4
|-
| align=center | 2019-20
| align=left | Hapoel Eilat
| IPL
| 21 || 28.9 || .525 || .000 || .589 || 9.3 || 1.1 || .8 || .7 || 11.6
|-
|-class=sortbottom
| align="center" colspan=2 | Career
| All Leagues
| 146 || 31.1 || .611 || .000 || .607 || 11.9 || 1.4 || .8 || .8 || 14.5

Awards and accomplishments
Voluntari
Romanian Cup: (2022)

References

External links
 Pacific Tigers bio
 RealGM profile

1993 births
Living people
American expatriate basketball people in China
American expatriate basketball people in Germany
American expatriate basketball people in Israel
American expatriate basketball people in Japan
American expatriate basketball people in Switzerland
American expatriate basketball people in South Korea
American men's basketball players
Basketball players from Detroit
Centers (basketball)
CSO Voluntari players
ETB Wohnbau Baskets players
Hapoel Eilat basketball players
Hiroshima Dragonflies players
Kagawa Five Arrows players
Pacific Tigers men's basketball players
Power forwards (basketball)
Saddleback Gauchos men's basketball players